A Woman with Style is a 1928 German silent film directed by Fritz Wendhausen and starring Mady Christians, Peter C. Leska and Hans Thimig. It was shot at the Terra Studios in Berlin. The film's sets were designed by the art director Hans Jacoby.

Cast

References

Bibliography

External links

1928 films
Films of the Weimar Republic
Films directed by Fritz Wendhausen
German silent feature films
Terra Film films
Films with screenplays by Fritz Wendhausen
German black-and-white films
Films shot at Terra Studios